John Souter (1844 – 13 July 1905) was a New Zealand cricketer. He played in three first-class matches for Canterbury from 1871 to 1874.

See also
 List of Canterbury representative cricketers

References

External links
 

1844 births
1905 deaths
New Zealand cricketers
Canterbury cricketers
Cricketers from Christchurch